Daniel Taub (Hebrew: דניאל טאוב; born 1962) is an Israeli diplomat, international lawyer and writer of British origin who served as Israel's Ambassador to the United Kingdom from 2011 to 2015. He is director of strategy and planning at the Yad Hanadiv (Rothschild) Foundation in Jerusalem.

Biography
Daniel Taub was born and raised in London. He attended secondary school at the Haberdashers' Aske's Boys' School in Elstree, Hertfordshire, and thereafter studied at University College, Oxford, University College, London and Harvard University. Taub moved to Israel in 1989. He served as a combat medic in the Israel Defense Forces (IDF), and subsequently as a reserve officer in the IDF Military Advocate General Office's international law division. Soon after arriving in Israel, Taub worked as speechwriter for President Chaim Herzog. He joined the Israeli Foreign Ministry in 1991.

Diplomatic career

Taub has held many diplomatic, legal and political posts in the Israeli Foreign Ministry. He is an expert in international law, with specialisations in counter-terrorism and the laws of war. As Principal Deputy Legal Advisor of Israel's Ministry of Foreign Affairs, Taub served as legal adviser to Israel's missions to the United Nations in New York and Geneva, and represented Israel in many multilateral fora.

Taub was a negotiator in the Israeli-Palestinian peace process, and a member of Israel's negotiation team in the Israel-Syrian negotiations. He headed Israel's observer delegation to the International Court of Justice hearings on Israel's security barrier, represented Israel before the UN investigative committee on the Gaza flotilla incident, and negotiated the entry of Israel's Red Cross society, Magen David Adom, into the International Red Cross Movement, after 70 years of exclusion.

Ambassador to the UK
In 2011, Taub was appointed Ambassador to the Court of St James's. Placing a strong emphasis on trade and technology links, Taub introduced the Bizcamp start-up competition in conjunction with Google and was nominated for the Grassroot Diplomat Initiative Award for developing business and trade. Between the years 2011 and 2013, UK-Israel bilateral trade increased to $8 billion.

Taub is a lecturer and public speaker, He has been interviewed widely on television including on Hardtalk, CNN, Newsnight, Sky News, and the BBC Radio 4's Today programme, and was the first Israeli Ambassador to be interviewed on the BBC Persian service. In addition to serving as Ambassador to the UK, in March 2013 Taub became Israel's first Ambassador to the International Maritime Organization which is based in London.

Taub's appointment as Ambassador ended in 2015, and he returned to Israel. It was later reported that during his tenure British security officials had complained to the embassy about late-night "security breaches" involving unauthorised male visitors to Taub's home that were not logged with security officials, which meant that they were no longer able to offer him effective security. The Israeli Foreign Ministry conducted an internal enquiry into the reports, and concluded that "there had been a breach of security protocol" but there had been no "criminal or disciplinary wrongdoing."

Taub is married, with six children.

Media career
Taub writes frequently on Israel and the Middle East, including articles appearing in The Times, The Daily Telegraph, The Guardian, and the Huffington Post.

Taub wrote Parasha Diplomatit, a book of diplomatic insights on biblical texts. He was also the creator and chief scriptwriter of an Israeli drama series, Hechatzer, set in an ultra-orthodox Hasidic sect.

References

External links
Daniel Taub Official Website
Daniel Taub Official Israeli Website

1962 births
Living people
Ambassadors of Israel to the United Kingdom
British emigrants to Israel
British Jews
Israeli Jews
Harvard Kennedy School alumni
People educated at Haberdashers' Boys' School
Alumni of University College, Oxford
Alumni of University College London